Arriverà is a song by pop-rock group Modà featuring Italian singer, Emma Marrone. The song was composed by the band frontman and lead singer Kekko Silvestre with the guitarist, Enrico Zapparoli. The song was performed on February 15, 2011 during the first evening of the Sanremo Festival 2011 and made available to download the following day. The song is included in the album Viva I Romantici Dei Modà (also in a version without Emma) and A me piace così (Sanremo Edition) by Emma.

At Sanremo  
The song took part in the 61st edition of the Sanremo Festival, appearing from the outset, among the favorites for the victory. In the fourth evening the piece is presented as a duet with the singer Francesco Renga, who said:

"Sono molto felice di duettare con i Modà ed Emma: sono artisti che stimo e la canzone mi è piaciuta subito al primo ascolto. Spero di essere un portafortuna per la finale."

"I am very happy to duet with Modà and Emma: they are artists that I respect and I immediately liked the song when I first heard it. I hope to be a lucky charm for the final."

The song came in second place behind Chiamami Ancora Amore by Roberto Vecchioni. During the Festival the orchestration of the piece was directed by Adriano Pennino. As defined by Modà's frontman Kekko Silvestre, the song is "a conversation between a girl in difficulty and a friend of hers." On the piece, Emma declared:

"È favoloso, e nel suo essere rock misto all'eleganza del pop mi rappresenta in pieno."

"It's fabulous, and in its being rock mixed with the elegance of pop it fully represents me."

Subsequently, the single was included in various compilations, including Sanremo 2011, Wind Music Awards 2011, Radio Italia. 30 years of singles ranked first and Je t'aime 2012.

Controversy  
After the conclusion of the Sanremo Festival the label Ultrasuoni, a record company founded by RTL 102.5, RDS and Radio Italia, which has Modà as signed artist, has accused Radio RAI of boycotting the single, not including it in their playlists. The director of Radio Rai defended himself against the accusations, declaring:

"Modà? We appreciate them, but their product is not in line with the sound and the musical choices of our radio regarding the so-called playlist."

In the same period, the AGCM, the agency of free competition and the market, released a statement, after some record companies have denounced the exaggerated overexposure of the Modà on the three radio networks. Accused of conflict of interests, as producers of the band, and to give less visibility to other artists.

In many of the critics and journalists, they noticed a particular resemblance to the 1966 song Riderà by the San Marinese singer Little Tony, so much so that Modà were repeatedly accused of plagiarism.

Commercial success 
The song reached number one on the Top Singles for five weeks [15] and has been certified multiplatinum for over 60,000 digital sales. In the annual standings of the end of the year, also compiled by FIMI, it appears to be the 7th most downloaded song in Italy in 2011.

Music video 
The music video, directed by Gaetano Morbioli, was made available immediately at the end of the first evening, on February 15, 2011.  The video, shot at the Teatro alle Vigne di Lodi and sees the participation of actors Davide Silvestri and Valentina Bellè.

Of the video, as well as of the single, there are two versions: one as a duet with Emma and one in which only Modà appear.

Track 
Lyrics by Francesco Silvestre, composed by Francesco Silvestre, Enrico Zapparoli, Enrico Palmosi.

 Arriverà (feat Emma) - 3:33

Charts

Year-end charts

Notes 

2011 singles
Emma Marrone songs
2011 songs